Dame Beverley Ann Macnaughton Lang,  KC (born 13 October 1955), styled The Hon. Ms Justice Lang, is a judge of the High Court of England and Wales.

She was educated at Wycombe Abbey School and Lady Margaret Hall, Oxford. She was called to the Bar at Inner Temple in 1978 and worked as a lecturer at the University of East Anglia from 1978 to 1981. She was appointed a Queen's Counsel in 2000, Recorder from 2006 to 2011, and judge of the High Court of Justice (Queen's Bench Division) since 2011. On 15 March 2012, Lang was appointed to the Order of the British Empire as a Dame Commander (DBE).

She was elected an honorary fellow of Lady Margaret Hall in 2011. She is a granddaughter of Archibald Orr Lang.

In a case concerning Transport for London's Streetspace scheme, her January 2021 ruling in favour of the Licensed Taxi Drivers' Association and United Trade Action Group was "comprehensively" overturned by the Court of Appeal. The appeal justices described her choice of language in the January ruling as "extraordinary and not right".

References

1955 births
Living people
People educated at Wycombe Abbey
Alumni of Lady Margaret Hall, Oxford
Fellows of Lady Margaret Hall, Oxford
Academics of the University of East Anglia
English women judges
Queen's Bench Division judges
Dames Commander of the Order of the British Empire
21st-century English judges